Cover Me is a studio album by German pop singer Nena, released in 2007. In it she covers her favorite songs, with the first CD devoted to German-language originals and the second to English-language originals. "Mach die Augen auf", "Ich werde dich lieben", and "Mein Weg ist mein Weg" were released as singles.

Track listing

Charts

References

External links
 Cover Me at the official Nena website
 
 

2007 albums
Nena albums
Covers albums
German-language albums
Warner Music Group albums